Anthony Ricardo Paige (born October 14, 1962 in Washington, D.C.) is a former professional American football player who played running back for nine seasons for the New York Jets, Detroit Lions, and Miami Dolphins of the National Football League. Paige went professional in 1984 as a sixth round selection of the New York Jets. He led the Jets in touchdowns (10) as a rookie starter. After nine seasons in the league, he retired at the age of 30.

Playing career
Paige’s football career began at DeMatha Catholic High School in Maryland, where he would later be elected into the school’s Hall of Fame. He then donned the Chicago maroon and burnt orange at Virginia Tech. Paige is considered one of the finest blocking and receiving fullbacks to ever play for the Hokies and was also inducted into the school’s Sports Hall of Fame.

Agent and Broadcasting Career
He has been an NFL agent since 1994, representing players like Cam Newton of the Carolina Panthers, Randy Starks of the Miami Dolphins and 4-time Pro Bowl selection Kris Jenkins, now a Studio Analyst for SNY and CBS. He is with the Washington, D.C.-based representation firm Perennial Sports and Entertainment.

External links
 Tony Paige Biography on Perennial Sports and Entertainment Website

1962 births
Living people
People from Washington, D.C.
African-American players of American football
American football running backs
New York Jets players
Detroit Lions players
Miami Dolphins players
Virginia Tech Hokies football players
DeMatha Catholic High School alumni
21st-century African-American people
20th-century African-American sportspeople